Preston Demond Knowles (born March 29, 1989) is an American professional basketball player for Aurora Jesi of the Italian Serie A2 Basket. He formerly played college basketball for the Louisville Cardinals.

High school and college career
Knowles attended George Rogers Clark High School in his native Winchester, Kentucky. 
He stayed in the state for college, signing with Louisville, playing in the Big East Conference of the NCAA Division I, in 2007.
Playing for the Cardinals, he was noted for his work ethic, defense, and three-point shooting, regularly amongst the best in the Conference in shooting percentage from three.

Professional career
Knowles signed a contract with Ukrainian Basketball SuperLeague side Dnipro-Azot in December 2012, he ended up playing in 3 games in the league before leaving the side that same month.

The American then returned home, signing with the Springfield Armor of the NBA Development League in January 2012.
He finished the 2011–12 season with the Armor, averaging 7.3 points, 1.1 assists and 1.1 steals in nearly 17 minutes per game after playing 31 games.

After another stint with Dnipro-Azot in which he didn't play a competitive game, Knowles moved to Greek Basket League K.A.O.D. American Genetics in October 2012. He finished the 2012–13 with 12.5 points, 4.2 rebounds and 2.4 assists in more than 27 minutes per game after playing in 23 games.

In the 2013 summer off-season, Knowles signed a contract to play for Ironi Nes Ziona in the Israeli Basketball Super League.
In August 2014, his deal was extended for another season.

In July 2015, Knowles moved to Italian Lega Basket Serie A outfit Giorgio Tesi Group Pistoia, signing for the 2015–16 season.

The 2016–17 season, Knowles started with AEK Larnaca but left the club after appearing in two games. On December 18, 2016, he signed with Israeli club Maccabi Ashdod.

On August 25, 2017, Knowles signed with the Croatian team Zadar for the 2017–18 season. He averaged 14.5 points and 4.2 rebounds per game.

On July 17, 2018, Knowles signed with the Italian second division squad Derthona Basket. In January 2019, Knowles moved to another Serie A2 Basket club, Aurora Jesi.

References

External links
FIBA game center profile Retrieved 31 July 2015
Israeli Super League profile Retrieved 31 July 2015
RealGM profile Retrieved 31 July 2015

1989 births
Living people
ABA League players
AEK Larnaca B.C. players
American expatriate basketball people in Croatia
American expatriate basketball people in Cyprus
American expatriate basketball people in Israel
American expatriate basketball people in Italy
American expatriate basketball people in Ukraine
Basketball players from Kentucky
BC Dnipro-Azot players
Ironi Nes Ziona B.C. players
Israeli Basketball Premier League players
K.A.O.D. B.C. players
KK Zadar players
Louisville Cardinals men's basketball players
Maccabi Ashdod B.C. players
People from Winchester, Kentucky
Pistoia Basket 2000 players
Point guards
Springfield Armor players
American men's basketball players
American expatriate basketball people in Thailand
ASEAN Basketball League players